The ruins of the St. Mary Church is a Cultural Monument of Albania, located in Shën Mëri, Krujë District.

References

Cultural Monuments of Albania
Church ruins in Albania
Buildings and structures in Krujë